Everett James Teaford (born May 15, 1984) is an American former professional baseball pitcher who played in Major League Baseball (MLB) for the Kansas City Royals and Tampa Bay Rays, and in the KBO League for the LG Twins.

Amateur career
Teaford was born May 15, 1984, in Alpharetta, Georgia. He attended Centennial High School in Roswell, Georgia, and then Georgia Southern University. In 2005, he played collegiate summer baseball with the Orleans Cardinals of the Cape Cod Baseball League. As a junior at Georgia Southern, he had a 10–4 record and a 3.96 earned run average (ERA). He tied for second in the Southern Conference in wins and led it in innings pitched, strikeouts (122), and complete games (four). He decided to become a professional after his junior year, having finished his collegiate career with the second-most strikeouts (353) of anyone to play at Georgia Southern. He was drafted by the Kansas City Royals in the 12th round of the 2006 Major League Baseball draft.

Professional career

Minor leagues
Teaford played for the Idaho Falls Chukars in 2006, going 5–1 with a 3.71 ERA in 15 games (12 starts). He pitched for the Burlington Bees in 2007, posting a 6–8 record with a 4.68 ERA in 27 games (21 starts). In 2008, Teaford pitched for the Wilmington Blue Rocks and went 8–6 with a 3.80 ERA in 28 games (23 starts). He split 2009 between the Blue Rocks and Northwest Arkansas Naturals, going 10–8 with a 3.91 ERA in 27 starts. In 2010, he went 14–4 with a 3.82 ERA in 28 games (13 starts) for the Naturals and Omaha Royals. He struck out 117 batters in 103 2/3 innings.

Kansas City Royals

2011
Teaford was promoted to Kansas City for the first time on May 16, 2011, to replace Vin Mazzaro. Since starting on May 16, 2011, Everett Teaford has played in a total of 14 games. On August 3, 2011, Teaford earned his first major league save in a 6–2 Royals victory over the Baltimore Orioles. In 26 games (3 starts) with the Royals in 2011, he went 2–1 with a 3.27 ERA and 1 hold, striking out 28 in 44 innings.

2012
Teaford made the Royals' opening-day roster in 2012, beating out Louis Coleman, and was one of three left-handed relievers to make the team. Teaford pitched 4 scoreless innings in his season debut on April 13 against the Indians. In his first start, against the Twins on April 27, he went 4 innings, giving up 8 hits and 4 runs in a no-decision. After the start, he was optioned to the Triple-A Omaha Storm Chasers, and was replaced by Nate Adcock. He made 3 starts for the Storm Chasers before being recalled on May 17 to start the game on May 20 against Arizona, only to go on the disabled list with a lower abdominal strain without making the start. He was again replaced by Adcock, who made the start. He appeared in 4 more games with Omaha before being recalled on June 27, replacing Francisley Bueno. He started that day's game, going 5 innings, giving up 4 hits and 2 runs while striking out 5. He made 2 more starts before being moved to the bullpen, where he was replaced by Ryan Verdugo. He made one start in September, but was used mostly as a long reliever during his time up. In 18 games (5 starts) in 2012 with the Royals, he went 1–4 with a 4.99 ERA, striking out 35 in 61.1 innings.

2013
Teaford began 2013 in Omaha's bullpen, and was sporadically used to make starts throughout the season. He was recalled on July 13 to replace fellow left-handed reliever Donnie Joseph, who had pitched the previous two games. He made one appearance with Kansas City, and was optioned back to Omaha during the All-Star break, where he finished the year. In 31 games (14 starts) with Omaha, he went 4–6 with a 3.49 ERA, striking out 99 in 95.1 innings.

LG Twins
Teaford was designated for assignment by the Royals on January 29, 2014.  On February 7, he was outrighted to the Omaha Storm Chasers. On March 30, 2014, Teaford was sold to the LG Twins.

Tampa Bay Rays
Teaford signed a minor league deal with the Tampa Bay Rays on January 16, 2015. He was designated for assignment on April 28, 2015. He was called back up by the Rays on July 4, 2015. He was designated for assignment for a second time when Andrew Bellatti was activated from the DL.

Retirement
In January 2018, it was announced that Teaford would join the Chicago White Sox as a quality control coach to help with player development.

Pitching style
Teaford has a wide variety of pitches: he throws a four-seam fastball (89–92 mph), a two-seam fastball (89–91), a cutter (87–89), a curveball (79–81), and a changeup (83–86). He has also experimented with a slider.

References

External links

 Career statistics and player information from Korea Baseball Organization

Living people
1984 births
Baseball players from Georgia (U.S. state)
American expatriate baseball players in South Korea
Major League Baseball pitchers
KBO League pitchers
Kansas City Royals players
LG Twins players
Tampa Bay Rays players
Georgia Southern Eagles baseball players
Orleans Firebirds players
Idaho Falls Chukars players
Burlington Bees players
Northwest Arkansas Naturals players
Omaha Royals players
Omaha Storm Chasers players
Leones del Escogido players
American expatriate baseball players in the Dominican Republic
Durham Bulls players